Derek is a masculine given name. It may also refer to:

People
 Derek (surname), an English-language surname
 Đerek, a Croatian surname
 Derek (footballer), Brazilian footballer

Other uses
 Derek (TV series)
 Derek (film), a 2008 British documentary film
 "Derek" (The Good Place episode)
 Derek (video game)